Boscaglia is an Italian surname. Notable people with the surname include:

Clara Boscaglia (1930–1990), Sammarinese politician
Cosimo Boscaglia ( 1550–1621), Italian philosopher
Roberto Boscaglia (born 1968), Italian footballer and manager

Italian-language surnames